Helmut Giesbrecht (February 18, 1943 – October 9, 2020) was an educator and political figure in British Columbia. He represented Skeena in the Legislative Assembly of British Columbia from 1991 to 2001 as a New Democratic Party (NDP) member.

Career
Giesbrecht was born in Ukraine. He was educated at the University of British Columbia and taught in Terrace, British Columbia for 24 years. Giesbrecht was a member of the Terrace City Council, serving as mayor from 1981 to 1985. He was also a member of the executive of the Terrace District's Teachers Union, served as president of the Terrace District Teachers' Association and was a director for the Terrace and District Credit Union. He served in the provincial cabinet as Minister responsible for the Public Service and Minister of Transportation and Highways. Giesbrecht was defeated by Roger Harris when he ran for re-election in 2001.

Following the 1996 election, an unsuccessful recall campaign was launched against Giesbrecht.

Giesbrecht died on October 9, 2020, aged 77.

References 

1943 births
2020 deaths
British Columbia municipal councillors
British Columbia New Democratic Party MLAs
Mayors of places in British Columbia
People from Terrace, British Columbia
Members of the Executive Council of British Columbia
University of British Columbia alumni
Canadian schoolteachers
Canadian trade unionists
Canadian people of Ukrainian descent
Soviet emigrants to Canada